A radial axle is an axle on a railway locomotive or carriage which has been designed to move laterally, along the arc of a circle, when entering a curve in order to reduce the flange and rail wear. William Bridges Adams was an early developer of radial axles.

Radial axles were widely used on carriages in the late 19th century before the adoption of bogies. They were also used on the leading or trailing carrying axles of locomotives, particularly tank locomotives. The idea was tried successfully by William Adams on the London and South Western Railway in 1882 in a class now known as  "Adams Radials".

Radial axles were also used in locomotives designed by  F.W. Webb of the London and North Western Railway, and by William Stroudley and R. J. Billinton of the London Brighton and South Coast Railway. Webb's form of radial axle used a cannon box bearing where the two axle bearings are carried in a single curved casting, the 'cannon box', which can slide sideways in a circular track. David Joy, designer of the eponymous valvegear, described encountering these axleboxes on Webb's Precedent class. The earlier Adams design had relied on the axle and thrust-faces within the axle bearings to keep the hornblocks in position.

Sources

 

Steam locomotive technologies
Train axles